Trevor Lee is an American wrestler.

Trevor Lee may also refer to:

 Trevor Lee (architect), Australian architect
 Trevor Lee (footballer) (born 1954), English footballer